Loi-ai (also known as Lwe-e) was a Shan state in the Myelat region of what is today Burma. It was one of the westernmost Shan states, bordering with Yamethin district of Upper Burma. The capital was Lonpo (Aungpan) and the population was mostly Pa-O, but there were also Danu, Shan and Karen people in the area.

History
Loi-ai was a subsidiary state of Yawnghwe, another state of the Myelat division of the Southern Shan States. Loi ai State merged with Hsamönghkam State in 1930.

Rulers
The rulers bore the title Ngwegunhmu.

Ngwegunhmus
.... - ....                Maung Baung [1st ruler]
.... - ....                Maung Maing
.... - 1814                Paw Kyi 
1814 - 1834                Maung Shwe 
1834 - 1864                Kaw Thaw 
1864 - 1868                Maung Kaing                        (d. 1870) 
1868 - 1869                Nga Meik -Regent
1869 - 1870                Nga Hpo -Regent
1870 - Oct 1903            Hkun Shwe Kyn                      (b. 18.. - d. 1903) 
Oct 1903 - 1913            Maung Po Kinm                      (b. 1876 - d. 1913)
1913 - 1925                Chit Pa -Regent                    (b. 1853 - d. 19..)
1913 - 19..                Maung Sao Maung                    (b. 1904 - d. ....)

References

External links

The Imperial Gazetteer of India

19th century in Burma
Shan States

ca:Lonpo